Meana may refer to:

 Teresa Meana Suárez (born 1952), Spanish feminist activist, teacher, and philologist
 Meana di Susa, in the province of Turin, Piedmont
 Meana Sardo, in the province of Nuoro, Sardinia